Sixteen Days or 16 Days may refer to:
Sixteen Days, English name of the Tamil-language Indian film Laadam based on Lucky Number Slevin
Sixteen Days, 1939 novel by Hans Habe
Sixteen Days/Gathering Dust, an EP and a medley by the band This Mortal Coil, based on two songs by Modern English
"Sixteen Days", a 1981 song by the band Modern English from the album Mesh & Lace
"16 Days" (song), a 1997 song by Ryan Adams, covered by the Clarks, Devil Doll and others
"Sixteen Days", a 1998 song by The Appleseed Cast from album The End of the Ring Wars

See also
Sixteen Days of Glory, a 1986 American documentary
16 Days in Afghanistan, a 2007 American documentary